Harry White (born 19 February 1995) is an English cricketer. He made his first-class debut for Derbyshire against the Australians on 23 July 2015.

48 off 43 balls, including eight 4s and one 6 against Hilton CC (div 4s), 06/08/2022
Renowned for being in the shadow of his brother Wayne White.

References

External links
 

1995 births
Living people
English cricketers
Derbyshire cricketers
Cricketers from Derby